Gantz: E (stylized as GANTZ:E) is a Japanese manga series written by Hiroya Oku and illustrated by Jin Kagetsu. It is a spin-off to Oku's Gantz manga series, set in the Edo period. Gantz: E started in Shueisha's seinen manga magazine Weekly Young Jump in January 2020.

Publication
Gantz: E, written by Hiroya Oku and illustrated by Jin Kagetsu, started in Shueisha's seinen manga magazine Weekly Young Jump on January 9, 2020. The manga is being published on a monthly basis. Shueisha has collected its chapters into individual tankōbon volumes. The first volume was released on August 19, 2020. As of July 19, 2022, four volumes have been released.

Volume list

References

External links
 

Gantz
Alien invasions in comics
Comics about death
Fiction about death games
Extraterrestrials in anime and manga
Historical anime and manga
Science fiction anime and manga
Seinen manga
Shueisha manga
Teleportation in fiction